Andrew Wheeler Doig (July 24, 1799 – July 11, 1875) was an American businessman and politician who served two terms as a U.S. Representative from New York from 1839 to 1843.

Biography 
Born in Salem, New York, Doig pursued an academic course.  He moved to Lowville, New York, and engaged in mercantile pursuits.  He served as town clerk of Lowville in 1825, and as county clerk of Lewis County from 1825–1831.  He was a member of the New York State Assembly in 1832.  He moved to Martinsburg, New York, in 1833.  He worked as the Cashier of the Lewis County Bank in 1833 and 1834.  He returned to Lowville, where he served as surrogate of Lewis County from 1835–1840.

Tenure in Congress 
Doig was elected as a Democrat to the Twenty-sixth and Twenty-seventh Congresses (March 4, 1839 – March 3, 1843).  He represented the Sixteenth District of New York both times.

Later career and death 
He served as member of the board of directors and vice president of the Bank of Lowville 1843–1847.  He moved to California in 1849 and engaged in mining.  He returned in 1850 to Lowville, New York, where he resided until late in life.  He served as clerk in the Customs House, New York City, from 1853 to 1857.

He died in Brooklyn, New York, July 11, 1875.  He was interred in the Rural Cemetery, Lowville, New York.

References

1799 births
1875 deaths
American bankers
People from Lowville, New York
Democratic Party members of the New York State Assembly
Democratic Party members of the United States House of Representatives from New York (state)
People from Salem, New York
People from Martinsburg, New York
19th-century American politicians
19th-century American businesspeople